Adnan Sarajlić (born January 6, 1981) is a Bosnian-Herzegovinian retired footballer.

Club career
He came to Budućnost Banovići from Sloboda Tuzla where he was the captain. In August 2013, Sarajlić joined OFK Gradina.

References

External links
 Stats from Slovenia at PrvaLiga.

1981 births
Living people
Sportspeople from Tuzla
Association football midfielders
Bosnia and Herzegovina footballers
Bosnia and Herzegovina under-21 international footballers
ND Gorica players
FK Sloboda Tuzla players
Al-Muharraq SC players
NK Zadar players
HNK Orašje players
FK Budućnost Banovići players
OFK Gradina players
Slovenian PrvaLiga players
Premier League of Bosnia and Herzegovina players
Bahraini Premier League players
First Football League (Croatia) players
First League of the Federation of Bosnia and Herzegovina players
Bosnia and Herzegovina expatriate footballers
Expatriate footballers in Slovenia
Bosnia and Herzegovina expatriate sportspeople in Slovenia
Expatriate footballers in Bahrain
Bosnia and Herzegovina expatriate sportspeople in Bahrain
Expatriate footballers in Croatia
Bosnia and Herzegovina expatriate sportspeople in Croatia